In algebra, a domain is a nonzero ring in which  implies  or . (Sometimes such a ring is said to "have the zero-product property".) Equivalently, a domain is a ring in which 0 is the only left zero divisor (or equivalently, the only right zero divisor).   A commutative domain is called an integral domain.  Mathematical literature contains multiple variants of the definition of "domain".

Examples and non-examples 

 The ring Z/6Z is not a domain, because the images of 2 and 3 in this ring are nonzero elements with product 0.  More generally, for a positive integer n, the ring Z/nZ is a domain if and only if n is prime.
 A finite domain is automatically a finite field, by Wedderburn's little theorem.
 The quaternions form a noncommutative domain. More generally, any division algebra is a domain, since all its nonzero elements are invertible.
 The set of all integral quaternions is a noncommutative ring which is a subring of quaternions, hence a noncommutative domain.
 A matrix ring Mn(R) for n ≥ 2 is never a domain: if R is nonzero, such a matrix ring has nonzero zero divisors and even nilpotent elements other than 0. For example, the square of the matrix unit E12 is 0.
 The tensor algebra of a vector space, or equivalently, the algebra of polynomials in noncommuting variables over a field,  is a domain. This may be proved using an ordering on the noncommutative monomials.
 If R is a domain and S is an Ore extension of R then S is a domain.
 The Weyl algebra is a noncommutative domain.
 The universal enveloping algebra of any Lie algebra over a field is a domain. The proof uses the standard filtration on the universal enveloping algebra and the Poincaré–Birkhoff–Witt theorem.

Group rings and the zero divisor problem 

Suppose that G is a group and K is a field. Is the group ring  a domain?  The identity

 

shows that an element g of finite order  induces a zero divisor  in R. The zero divisor problem asks whether this is the only obstruction; in other words,

 Given a field K and a torsion-free group G, is it true that K[G] contains no zero divisors?

No counterexamples are known, but the problem remains open in general (as of 2017).

For many special classes of groups, the answer is affirmative. Farkas and Snider proved in 1976 that if G is a torsion-free polycyclic-by-finite group and  then the group ring K[G] is a domain. Later (1980) Cliff removed the restriction on the characteristic of the field. In 1988, Kropholler, Linnell and Moody generalized these results to the case of torsion-free solvable and solvable-by-finite groups.

Spectrum of an integral domain 

Zero divisors have a topological interpretation, at least in the case of commutative rings: a ring R is an integral domain if and only if it is reduced and its spectrum Spec R is an irreducible topological space. The first property is often considered to encode some infinitesimal information, whereas the second one is more geometric.

An example: the ring , where k is a field, is not a domain, since the images of x and y in this ring are zero divisors. Indeed, these two lines are its irreducible components.

See also 
 Zero divisor
 Zero-product property
 Divisor (ring theory)
 Integral domain

Notes

References 
 
 
 
 
 

Ring theory
Algebraic structures